Lâm Anh Quang (born 24 April 1991) is a Vietnamese footballer who plays as a defender for V-League (Vietnam) club SHB Đà Nẵng.

References 

1991 births
Living people
Vietnamese footballers
Association football defenders
V.League 1 players
SHB Da Nang FC players
Nam Định F.C. players
People from Nam Định province